Gotteslob ("Praise of God") is the title of the hymnbook authorized by the Catholic dioceses in Germany, Austria, South Tyrol, Luxembourg and Liège, Belgium. First published in Advent 2013, it is the current official hymnal for German-speaking Catholics, succeeding the first common German hymnal, the 1975 edition of the same name. Each diocese published a book containing a common section and a regional section. The first editions amounted to around 4 million copies.

History 
Gotteslob was developed as a sequel of the first common German hymnal, Gotteslob of 1975. It was developed over a period of 10 years by around 100 experts, who studied the use of hymns, conducting surveys and running tests in selected congregations. Gotteslob was published by Catholic dioceses in Germany, Austria, South Tyrol, and is also used by German-speaking parishes in Luxembourg and the Diocese of Liège, Belgium. It was introduced from Advent 2013, beginning on 1 December. It is intended to serve as a hymnal for church services as well as for private use. The first editions were around 4 million copies.

Each diocese published a book containing a common section called Stammteil, and a regional section with hymns for the specific diocese.

Changes in 2013 
Some songs were composed for the 2013 edition, including the melody for "Heilig, heilig, heilig Gott" by Oliver Sperling. Some songs were moved from regional sections to the common section, including Christoph Bernhard Verspoell's Christmas carol "Menschen, die ihr wart verloren".

Hymns 
Hymns include "Den Herren will ich loben" and others by Maria Luise Thurmair. "Ein Haus voll Glorie schauet" is a popular hymn for consecration of a church and its anniversaries.

Among the regional hymns are the Easter hymn "Das Grab ist leer, der Held erwacht", the Trinity hymn "Gott Vater, sei gepriesen" and the Marian hymn "Nun, Brüder, sind wir frohgemut".

Reception 
Gotteslob was critically received as a book by too few experts, with too little input from the practicing congregations.

List of hymns 
This list is structured by the themes in the hymnal. The first column has the song's number in the hymnal, with an added letter ö for ökumenisch, meaning songs sung ecumenically, especially those also contained in the common Protestant hymnal Evangelisches Gesangbuch. The second column has the title, the third the origin of the text, the fourth the origin of the melody, the fifth notes such as for which occasion a song is useful.

See also 
 :Category:Catholic hymns in German

References

External links 

 
 
 Das neue Gotteslob (in German) Diocese of Cologne 2013
 Zur Einführung des neuen Gotteslob (in German) Diocese of Stuttgart December 2013
 Videoclips zu fast allen Gesängen aus dem "Gotteslob"-Stammteil (in German) kirchenmusikkommission.at March 2020
 Abgleich Gotteslob 1975 – Gotteslob 2013 Diocese of Würzburg 2013

Catholic Church in Germany
Catholic Church in Austria
Catholic Church in Italy
Catholic Church in Belgium
Catholic hymnals
2013 books